El Giral is a town in the Colón province of Panama.

Sources 
World Gazeteer: Panama – World-Gazetteer.com

Populated places in Colón Province